Sears Building is the name of a number of buildings across North America, most of which have been converted to other uses since being Sears regional headquarters, warehouses, and/or retail stores:

Canada
 Toronto: 222 Jarvis Street

Mexico
 Mexico City: Edificio La Nacional

United States
(By state)
 Los Angeles, California (Boyle Heights): Sears, Roebuck & Company Mail Order Building (Los Angeles, California)
 Los Angeles, California (Pico and Rimpau blvds., Mid-City): Sears, Roebuck and Company Retail Department Store-Pico Boulevard, Los Angeles
 Washington, DC: Sears, Roebuck and Company Department Store (Washington, D.C.)
 Miami, Florida: Sears, Roebuck and Company Department Store (Miami, Florida)
 Atlanta, Georgia: Ponce City Market (formerly known as City Hall East 1990–2011)
 Chicago, Illinois: Second Leiter Building
 Chicago, Illinois: Sears, Roebuck and Company Complex (also known as Sears Merchandise Building Tower)
 Chicago, Illinois: Willis Tower (former Sears Tower)
 Boston, Massachusetts: Landmark Center (Boston)
 Minneapolis, Minnesota: Midtown Exchange
 Camden, New Jersey: Sears, Roebuck and Company Retail Department Store-Camden
 Cleveland, Ohio: Sears Building at Case Western Reserve University
 Memphis, Tennessee: Sears Crosstown Concourse
 Seattle, Washington: Sears Roebuck and Company Building (Starbucks Center)

Historic department store buildings in the United States